Bandinelli Palace is a late Renaissance townhouse (kamienica) facing Market Square in Lviv, Ukraine. It was built in 1589 by a pharmacist Jarosz Wedelski, and in 1634 it was bought by a Florentine merchant, Roberto Bandinelli, known as the founder of the first post office in eastern  Galicia. That office was housed in the building from 1629 onward, and was closed in a few years when the business became unprofitable.

During the Thirty Years' War (1618–1648), a mint operated in the courtyard of the tenement house, which was moved from Kraków during the war.

The house was considerably renovated in 1737-1739. In the 19th century the palace was used as a bookshop and a meeting place for the local literati. Poet Kornel Ujejski lodged here.

References 

 Вуйцик В. С., Липка Р. М. Зустріч зі Львовом. Львів: Каменяр, 1987. С. 47-48.
 Лемко Ілько. Палац Бандінеллі.

External links 
 

Palaces in Ukraine
Former post office buildings
Buildings and structures in Lviv
Renaissance architecture in Ukraine